

Evening star may refer to:

Astronomy
 The planet Venus when it appears in the west (evening sky), after sunset
 The ancient Greeks gave it the name Hesperus
 Less commonly, the planet Mercury when it appears in the west (evening sky) after sunset

Plants
 Oenothera biennis, a medicinal plant
 Mentzelia pumila, and other species of Mentzelia

Arts and entertainment
 "Song to the Evening Star" ("O du mein holder Abendstern"), an aria from Richard Wagner's 1845 opera Tannhäuser
 The Evening Star, an engraving of a painting by Sir Thomas Lawrence for The Amulet, 1833 in combination with a poem by Letitia Elizabeth Landon.
 The Evening Star, an engraving of a painting by John Boaden for The Amulet, 1836, in combination with a poem by Letitia Elizabeth Landon.
 "Evening Star", a poem by Edgar Allan Poe
 The Evening Star, a 1996 sequel to the film Terms of Endearment
 Evening Star (Fripp & Eno album), 1975
 Evening Star (Joshua Breakstone album), 1988
 "Evening Star" (Kenny Rogers song), 1984
 "Evening Star" (Judas Priest song), from their 1978 album Killing Machine
"Evening Star", a song from the 1967 album For All the Seasons of Your Mind by Janis Ian
 "Evening Star", a song from the 2010 album Destroyer of the Void by Blitzen Trapper 
 "Evening Star", a song from the 2003 album Valley of the Damned by DragonForce
 "Evening Star", a song from the 2011 album The Lay of Thrym by Týr
 "Evening Star", a song from the 1992 album Death or Glory? by Roy Harper
 "Evening Star", a song from the 2009 album The Underfall Yard by Big Big Train
 Evening Star (video game), a 1987 train simulator
 The Evening Star (Traveller), a 1979 role-playing game supplement for Traveller

Other uses
 Evening Star (newspaper), a list of newspapers
 BR 92220 Evening Star, the last steam locomotive to be built by British Railways
British Rail Class 66 no. 66779, the last Class 66 built for the British market. Named in fitting with the last BR steam locomotive built. 
 Exercise Evening Star, the annual demonstration of emergency response to a submarine nuclear accident at Faslane, HMNB Clyde, Argyll, Scotland

See also
The Evening and the Morning Star (1832–1834), the first newspaper of the Latter Day Saint movement
 "To The Evening Star", a poem by William Blake from Poetical Sketches, 1783
 Luceafărul (poem) ("The Evening Star"), an 1883 poem by Mihai Eminescu
 "Abendstern" ("Evening Star"), a poem by Johann Mayrhofer set to music by Franz Schubert; see List of songs by Franz Schubert
 Arwen, an elf-maiden in J. R. R. Tolkien's writings is also referred to as "Undomiel", elvish for "Evenstar"
 Morning star (disambiguation)
 Evenstar (disambiguation)